Joseph or Joe Newton may refer to:

Joseph Newton (cricketer) (born 1950), Barbadian cricketer
Joseph Fort Newton (1876–1950), American Baptist minister
Joe Newton (coach) (1929–2017), high school coach of The Long Green Line cross country team
Joe Newton, drummer for Gas Huffer, now deputy art director for Rolling Stone magazine
Joe Newton, character in Alias John Preston
Joey Newton (born 1977), Australian America's Cup sailor

See also